The 2002 Rome summit was an exceptional (and thus unnumbered) NATO summit of NATO and Russia at the level of Heads of State and Government. NATO Allies and the Russian Federation created the NATO-Russia Council (NRC), which replaced the NATO–Russia Permanent Joint Council (PJC), established in 1997 as part of the Founding Act of Mutual Relations, Cooperation, and Security.

The summit was held in the Pratica di Mare Air Base outside Rome because of outstanding security requirements soon after the 9/11 attacks.

References

Summit of 2002
2002 Rome summit
2002 in politics
2002 in Italy
Diplomatic conferences in Italy
21st-century diplomatic conferences (NATO)
2002 in international relations
2002 conferences
May 2002 events in Europe
Events in Rome